Myrcia guianensis (pedra-ume-caá) is a species of plant in the genus Myrcia of the family Myrtaceae native to South America.

This species shows allelopathic effects on germination and radicle and hypocotyl growth of weeds. Isolated compounds related to this inhibition are gallic and protocatechuic acids.

This species is found in association with endophytic fungi.

References

External links
 

guianensis
Flora of South America